Saaz Aur Sanam  is a 1971 Bollywood romance film directed by J.B.H. Wadia. The film stars Rekha and Premendra.

Music
"Ye Meri Bala Jaane Hai Kitne Yahan Gam" - Kishore Kumar
"Dil Se Nazar Tak Tere Ujale Baaho Me Aaja Ya Mujhko Bula Le" - Kishore Kumar
"Na Rootho Hume Paas Aane Bhi Do, Chalo Hum Gunhegar Jaane Bhi Do" - Lata Mangeshkar
"Yeh Dil Jigar Jafaa Wafaa Hai Sab Kuch Fasaana" - Lata Mangeshkar
"Pal Pal Botal Chalke, Aankho Se Masti Dhalke" - Asha Bhosle

External links
 

1971 films
1970s Hindi-language films
1970s romance films
Films scored by Chitragupta
Indian romance films
Hindi-language romance films